Orangefield Independent School District is a public school district based in the community of Orangefield, Texas (USA).

In 2009, the school district was rated "recognized" by the Texas Education Agency.

Schools
Orangefield High School (Grades 9-12)
Orangefield Junior High (Grades 5-8)
Orangefield Elementary (Grades PK-4)

References

External links
Orangefield ISD

School districts in Orange County, Texas